Since its conception in 1907, the Scouting movement has spread from the United Kingdom to 216 countries and territories around the world. There are over 54 million Scouts worldwide, with 173 national organizations governed by the World Organization of the Scout Movement (WOSM).

Table of members 
The World Organization of the Scout Movement recognizes at most one Scouting organization per country.  Some countries have several organizations combined as a federation, with different component groups divided on the basis of religion (e.g., France and Denmark), ethnic identification (e.g., Israel), or language (e.g., Belgium). Canada is the only country to have two distinct recognized associations, which are divided by language. About 30 national Scout organizations are a member of WOSM and the World Association of Girl Guides and Girl Scouts, mostly from Europe and the Arab countries.

Non-sovereign territories with independent WOSM member organizations 
Hong Kong - The Scout Association of Hong Kong: Full Member of the World Organization of the Scout Movement
Aruba - Scouting Aruba: Full Member of the World Organization of the Scout Movement
French Polynesia - Conseil du Scoutisme polynésien: Associate Member of the Asia-Pacific Region of the World Organization of the Scout Movement
Macau - Associação de Escoteiros de Macau: Full Member of the World Organization of the Scout Movement
Curaçao, Sint Maarten and the Caribbean Netherlands (former Netherlands Antilles) - Scouting Antiano: Full Member of the World Organization of the Scout Movement

Countries and territories with Scouting run by overseas branches of WOSM member organizations 
Ten of these overseas branches of accredited National Scout Organizations are considered "potential members" by the WOSM (marked by *).

Sovereign countries

Served by the Boy Scouts of America 
Federated States of Micronesia - Scouting in the Federated States of Micronesia* - Aloha Council of the Boy Scouts of America
Marshall Islands - Scouting in the Marshall Islands* - Aloha Council of the Boy Scouts of America
Palau - Scouting in Palau* - Aloha Council of the Boy Scouts of America

Served by The Scout Association (UK) 
Saint Kitts and Nevis - The Scout Association of Saint Kitts and Nevis*
Tonga - Tonga branch of The Scout Association*
Tuvalu - Tuvalu Scout Association*
Vanuatu - Vanuatu branch of The Scout Association*

Served by Scouts Australia 
Nauru - Scouting in Nauru*

Non-sovereign territories

Australia 
Christmas Island - Scouts Australia
Cocos (Keeling) Islands - Scouts Australia
Norfolk Island - Scouts Australia

Denmark 
Faroe Islands - Føroya Skótaráð
Greenland - Grønlands Spejderkorps

France 
French Guiana - Scouting in French Guiana
Guadeloupe and Saint Martin - Scouting in Guadeloupe et Saint Martin
Martinique - Scouts et Guides de Martinique
Mayotte - Scouting in Mayotte
New Caledonia - Scouting in New Caledonia
Réunion - Scouting on Réunion
Saint Pierre and Miquelon - Scouting in Saint Pierre and Miquelon
Wallis and Futuna - Scouting in Wallis and Futuna

New Zealand 
Cook Islands - Cook Islands Boy Scout Association
Niue - Scouting and Guiding on Niue
Tokelau - Scouting and Guiding in Tokelau

United Kingdom 
Anguilla - The Scout Association of Anguilla
Bermuda - Bermuda Scout Association
Cayman Islands - The Scout Association of the Cayman Islands
Falkland Islands - Scouting and Guiding in the Falkland Islands
Gibraltar - The Scout Association of Gibraltar
Montserrat - The Scout Association of Montserrat
Saint Helena and Ascension Island - Scouting and Guiding on Saint Helena and Ascension Island
Turks and Caicos Islands - The Scout Association of the Turks and Caicos
British Virgin Islands - The Scout Association of the British Virgin Islands

United States 
American Samoa - Scouting in American Samoa - Aloha Council of the Boy Scouts of America
Guam - Scouting in Guam - Aloha Council of the Boy Scouts of America
Northern Marianas Islands - Scouting in the Northern Mariana Islands - Aloha Council of the Boy Scouts of America
Puerto Rico - Puerto Rico Council of the Boy Scouts of America
United States Virgin Islands - Scouting in the United States Virgin Islands is the responsibility of National Capital Area Council of the Boy Scouts of America

'Potential member countries' listed by WOSM 
In 2020, WOSM listed 25 sovereign countries as potential members. 10 of these were served by oversea branches of WOSM member organizations (see #Countries and territories with Scouting run by overseas branches of WOSM member organizations).

Albania - Scouting and Guiding in Albania. In 2014, the membership of Beslidhja Skaut Albania was terminated by WOSM with hopes to establish a new National Scouting Organization.
Central African Republic - Fédération du scoutisme centrafricain
Republic of the Congo - Association des Scouts et Guides du Congo
Djibouti - Association des Scouts de Djibouti
Equatorial Guinea - Scouting in Equatorial Guinea
Eritrea - National Scout Association of Eritrea
Iran - Iran Scout Organization
Kyrgyzstan - Scouting in Kyrgyzstan
Mali - Scouting in Mali
Samoa - Scouting in Samoa
Somalia - Scouting in Somalia
Turkmenistan - Scouting in Turkmenistan
Uzbekistan - Scouting in Uzbekistan

Countries with no Scouting organization 
In 2020, WOSM listed five sovereign countries as without Scouting; the list omitted Vatican City, which is also without Scouting.
Andorra - Scouting and Guiding in Andorra - reactivated in 2016
People's Republic of China (mainland China) - Scouting in Mainland China - Scout Association of the People's Republic of China
Cuba - Cuban Scouting prior to 1961 and in exile
Laos - Laotian Scouting prior to 1975 and in exile
North Korea - shared history with Korea Scout Association prior to 1950
Vatican City - Scouting in Vatican City

Other status 
Antarctica - Scouting in the Antarctic
Kosovo - Scouting in Kosovo - partially recognized state
Somaliland - Scouting in Somaliland - self-proclaimed unrecognized functional state within Somalia
Western Sahara - Scouting in Western Sahara

See also 

 List of World Association of Girl Guides and Girl Scouts members

References

Further reading

External links 
 WOSM: Scouting around the World 
  WOSM members worldmap

List
World Organization of the Scout Movement
World Organization of the Scout Movement members